The'Geared for Giving' Campaign was first launched at the House of Commons of the United Kingdom on 19 May 2008 by Anne Snelgrove, MP for South Swindon and Duncan Bannatyne OBE.

The Geared for Giving Campaign was originally established to raise awareness of Payroll Giving with UK business leaders. Payroll Giving (also known Give As You Earn) is a scheme of making charitable tax-efficient donations by giving directly from payroll to any charity.

In 2016 the campaign was relaunched. Geared for Giving continues as a fundraising campaign, this time with a new mission to double the amount raised by Payroll Giving for charities to £260m annually, by increasing the number of employees giving through pay from 1 million to 2 million.

References

External links
www.gearedforgiving.org Official Site

Charities based in the United Kingdom
Fundraising events